Shanmugham Road is a major road of Kochi, India, named after R. K. Shanmukham Chetty who was the Diwan of the Kingdom of Kochi from 1931 to 1945. It runs parallel to Kochi Backwaters, and popularly known as Marine Drive. It is a busy and highly commercialised street of the city, dotted with shopping centres and offices.

Initially, the road ran next to the backwaters. In the 1970s, land was reclaimed close to the road, yielding a narrow strip of prime real estate. This strip of land currently houses shopping malls and apartments. A tree lined walkway now borders the backwaters, which is a tourist attraction. More than half of the reclaimed land is left as open space, often used for gatherings, demonstrations and shows.

The road begins at the High Court Junction on the north end and ends at the Ernakulam Guest House near Broadway at the south. It continues further south as Park Avenue Road.

It is a four lane city road with a wide median separating the two carriageways. The headquarters of the Archdiocese of Verapoly is located on this road, as well as the Regional offices of State Bank of India, Federal Bank and Indian Bank. It is also home to The Gateway Hotel by Taj. Corporate office of Joy Alukkas is also located here.

This region is immensely popular for electronic goods and cosmetics.

Shanumugham road is one of the most fashionable locales in the country. There are many Shopping malls including Bay Pride mall in its vicinity.  Marine Drive Kochi ground hosts exhibitions and large meetings regularly.

Major eateries include Marrybrown at Abad Food Court in Bay Pride Mall, Sealord Hotel, Coffee Cube and SFSplus. Food Mall is also located near to Shanmugham Road at Revenue tower.

References  

Roads in Kochi